The 1971 World Modern Pentathlon Championships were held in San Antonio, United States.

Medal table

See also
 World Modern Pentathlon Championship

References

 Sport123

Modern pentathlon in North America
World Modern Pentathlon Championships, 1971
Texas Tech Texas
International sports competitions hosted by the United States
Sports competitions in San Antonio
World Modern Pentathlon Championships
International sports competitions in Texas
Multisports in the United States